The 2006 LPGA Championship was the 52nd LPGA Championship, played June 8–11 at Bulle Rock Golf Course in Havre de Grace, Maryland. This was the second of four major championships on the LPGA Tour in 2006.

Se Ri Pak, age 28, won her third LPGA Championship with a playoff victory over Karrie Webb. She three-putted the 72nd  hole to fall into a tie with Webb at 280 (−8), one stroke ahead of Ai Miyazato and Mi Hyun Kim. Webb had birdie opportunities on the final two holes, but parred both.

After a short tee shot on the first extra hole, Pak hit her long approach shot within inches for birdie to gain her fifth major title and 23rd win on the LPGA Tour, the first in two years.

This championship was played at Bulle Rock for five consecutive seasons, 2005 through 2009.

Past champions in the field

Made the cut

Source:

Missed the cut

Source:

Final leaderboard
Sunday, June 11, 2006

Source:

Playoff
On the first extra hole, Pak's tee shot popped up and was well behind Webb's, but her  approach shot stopped within inches of the cup; she tapped in for birdie and the title.

Source:

References

External links
Golf Observer leaderboard

Women's PGA Championship
Golf in Maryland
LPGA Championship
LPGA Championship
LPGA Championship
LPGA Championship